= SolarWave =

SolarWave was a Swedish company producing solar powered water purification systems. SolarWave was founded in 2009 by Bengt Skörelid and Thomas Larsson. The company had its headquarters in Gävle and was represented internationally by its subsidiaries SolarWave Tanzania Limited in Tanzania and SolarWave Uganda Limited in Uganda, as well as by resellers in several African countries. The company ceased operations in 2019 and was liquidated in 2021.
